Rochovce is a village and large municipality in the Rožňava District in the Košice Region of middle-eastern Slovakia.

History
In historical records the village was first mentioned in 1318.

Geography
The village lies at an altitude of 384 metres and covers an area of 8.33 km².
It has a population of about 325 people.

Culture
The village has a public library.

External links
 Rochovce
http://www.statistics.sk/mosmis/eng/run.html

Villages and municipalities in Rožňava District